Bhargavaram Viththal Varerkar (1883–1964), also known as Mama Warerkar, was  a Marathi writer from Bombay Presidency, India.

Varerkar was born in 1883 in Chiplun in the Konkan region. He attended high schools in Malvan, Dapoli and Ratnagiri. Before graduating he left his studies, worked for a while as a postal clerk, then migrated to Mumbai.

Varerkar wrote the play Kunjawihari (कुंजविहारी) in 1907. He wrote other plays with historic, mythological and social themes; he wrote many novels, short stories and film scripts. His writings strongly reflected his empathy for laborers under the dominance of their employers and the plight of women under male dominance.

He translated into Marathi many novels of Bengali writer Sharat Chandra Chatterji.

Varerkar presided over Marathi Sahitya Sammelan in Dhule in 1944. Later, he was nominated to Rajya Sabha, the upper house of Indian Parliament.

Works

Novels
 Widhawa Kumari (विधवा कुमारी) (1928)
 Parat Bhet (परत भेट) (1933)
 Dhawata Dhota (धावता धोटा)
 Godu Gokhale (गोदू गोखले)
 Tarate Polad (तरते पोलाद)
 Petate Pani (पेटते पाणी)
 Sat Lakhatil Ek (सात लाखातील एक)
 Drawidi Pranayam (द्राविडी प्राणायाम)
 Bhangad Galli (भानगडगल्ली)
 Kuldaiwat(कुलदैवत)

Plays
 Kunjawihari (कुंजविहारी) (1907)
 Hach Mulacha Bap (हाच मुलाचा बाप) (1917)
 Satteche Gulam (सत्तेचे गुलाम) (1922)
 Sonyacha Kalas (सोन्याचा कळस) (1932)
 Saraswat (सारस्वत) (1942)
 Bhumikanya Sita (भूमिकन्या सीता) (1955)

References

Marathi-language writers
1964 deaths
1883 births
Recipients of the Padma Bhushan in public affairs
Nominated members of the Rajya Sabha
Presidents of the Akhil Bharatiya Marathi Sahitya Sammelan
Recipients of the Sangeet Natak Akademi Award
Recipients of the Sangeet Natak Akademi Fellowship
Writers in British India